Ainslie Wood may refer to:

Places
 Ainslie Wood, Ontario, a residential neighbourhood in Hamilton, Ontario, Canada
 Ainslie Wood, London, a local nature reserve in Greater London